Isebakke is a village in the municipality of Halden, Norway. Its population (SSB 2005) is 770.

Please see www.isebakke.net

Villages in Østfold